A list of films produced in Italy in 1957 (see 1957 in film):

Notes

References

External links
Italian films of 1957 at the Internet Movie Database

1957
Films
Italian